The Socialist Alliance of Working People of Yugoslavia or SSRNJ (SSRNJ/ССРНЈ, SZDLJ, ССРНЈ), known before 1953 as the People's Front (Narodni Front or NOF in Serbo-Croatian, Ljudska fronta or LF in Slovene), was the largest and most influential mass organization in SFR Yugoslavia from August 1945 through 1990. By 1990 its membership was thirteen million individuals, including most of the adult population of the country. Together with the League of Communists of Serbia, it merged in July 1990 to form the Socialist Party of Serbia.

People's Front of Yugoslavia

People's Front of Yugoslavia was an organization of antifascist and democratic masses of nations of Yugoslavia. The idea of its creation sprang up in the 1930s, especially during the May 5, 1935 parliamentary elections in the Kingdom of Yugoslavia.

At the Plenary Meeting of the Central Committee of the Communist Party of Yugoslavia in June 1935 held in the city of Split (Dalmatia) it was concluded to form the Front of National Freedom. Also it was concluded that Fascism could be defeated by the joint efforts of proletariat, peasantry, nationally oppressed and all democratic and progressive layers of society. The basis for the Front of the People's Freedom would be the Communist Party of Yugoslavia joined by the trade unions, "left wings" of the peasant parties, youth, university students, cultural, educational, sports societies, different professional associations and national liberation movements under the auspices of civic parties. The main platform was:
The destruction of  the 6 January Regime,
Equal rights of the nations of Yugoslavia,
Preventing the burden of crisis on the back of the People and improving the economic position of broad working masses at the expense of the rich.

The Communist Party of Yugoslavia comprehended the People's Front (NF) as a political platform for the approaching of masses with its ideas and as a method of alliance with other opposition parties like civic, republican and democratic bourgeois parties.

The Communist Party of Yugoslavia was banned from political life of the country but remained seized with the matter of creating a singular People's Front up to the beginning of World War II.

At the conference in Stolice (Serbia) it was concluded that the antifascist movement should be transformed to a United People's Liberation Front of Yugoslavia.

Each of the future republics and autonomous provinces had its own People's Liberation Front.

People's front of republics and provinces

The first congress of the People's Front of Yugoslavia was held in Belgrade from August 5 to August 7, 1945. The Programme and the Statute of the National Front of Yugoslavia were passed. Edvard Kardelj gave the main guidelines for the NFY in his seminary which described the NFY as "the sole of the Nation, its reflection, its heroic uprising, its greatest majority – that it is – the Nation itself".

The NFY was the only organisation to contest the first postwar election, in 1945; opposition parties pulled out after claiming to have experienced severe intimidation. On 29 November, the  Communist-dominated parliament formally abolished the monarchy and declared Yugoslavia a republic. From that moment onward, the NFY was effectively the only legally permitted political organisation in the country.

At the fourth congress of the NFY it changed its name to the Socialist Alliance of the Working People of Yugoslavia. The congress accepted the proposal of the sixth congress of the Communist Party of Yugoslavia to have the name changed at the fourth congress of the National Front of Yugoslavia, held in Belgrade from February 22 to February 25, 1953.

Organizations within the People's Front
Antifascist Front of Women of Yugoslavia (AFŽ)
Croatian Peasant Party
Independent Democratic Party
Landworkers' Party 
National Peasant Party
Socialist Party of Yugoslavia
Social-Democratic Party of Yugoslavia
United Alliance of Antifascist Youth of Yugoslavia (USAOJ)
United Trade Union of Workers and Employees (JSRiN)
Yugoslav Republican Democratic Party

Parties that were not members of the People's Front:
Democratic Party
National Radical Party

Parliamentary elections

Reform and renaming
In 1953, the People's Front was renamed the Socialist Alliance of Working People of Yugoslavia (SSRNJ) and it would continue to be the largest (in terms of membership) mass organization in SFR Yugoslavia from August 1945 through 1990.

The political purpose of this national organization, sponsored by the League of Communists of Yugoslavia (SKJ), was to involve as many people as possible in activities on the party agenda, without the restrictions and negative connotations of direct party control. The SSRNJ also was chartered as a national arbitration forum for competing, cross-regional interests. Although party officials were forbidden to hold simultaneous office in SSRNJ, the top echelon of the latter was dominated by established party members. The importance of SSRNJ to the party leadership increased as the party's direct control over social and state institutions decreased. It was useful in mobilizing otherwise apathetic citizens during the Croatian crisis of 1971 and the Kosovo crisis of 1987.

The Constitution stipulated a wide variety of social and political functions for SSRNJ, including nomination of candidates for delegate at the commune level, suggesting solutions to national and local social issues to assembly delegates, and overseeing elections and public policy implementation. Both individuals and interest groups held membership. The structure of SSRNJ was very similar to that of the party, including a hierarchy that extended from national to commune level. SSRNJ organizations in the republics and provinces were simplified versions of the national structure. By 1959, the SSRNJ counted over 6.3 million individual members and 111 collective organizations under its umbrella.

The national organization was run by a conference of delegates chosen by the regional SSRNJ leadership. The conference presidium included members from the party, the armed forces, trade unions, Socialist Youth League, and other national organizations. Like the SKJ Central Committee, the SSRNJ conference established departments to formulate policy recommendations in areas such as economics, education, and sociopolitical relations. Coordinating committees were also active in interregional consultation on policy and mass political action. 

In SR Slovenia, the Socialist Alliance became an umbrella organization for a number of nonparty organizations with political interests, beginning in 1988. On a lesser scale, similar changes occurred in other republics. This development rekindled the idea that SSRNJ might be divorced from SKJ domination and reconstituted as a second political party at the national level. Pending such an event, SSRNJ was regarded throughout the 1980s as a puppet of the party elite, particularly by virtue of its exclusive control over the nomination of assembly delegates at the commune level.

One of the Presidents of the Federal Conference was Veljko Milatović.

Constituent Organizations Within the SSRNJ

Confederation of Trade Unions of Yugoslavia
League of Socialist Youth of Yugoslavia
Red Cross of Yugoslavia
Federation of Veterans Associations of the People’s Liberation War of Yugoslavia
Women's Antifascist Front of Yugoslavia
Partisan Society for Physical Education
Council of Associations for Child Welfare in Yugoslavia
Union of Pioneers of Yugoslavia
Society of Mechanical and Electrical Engineers and Technicians
Fund for Aid to Victims of Colonial Aggression and Domination
Coordination Committee for Aid to the People of Vietnam-Indochina

References
 Narodni front Jugoslavije, Političko odeljenje Ministarstva narodne odbrane, Beograd, 1945.
 Katarina Spehnjak, Narodni front Jugoslavije (SSRNJ) - razvoj, programsko-teorijske osnove i procesi u društvenoj praksi, published in Povijesni prilozi Year 3, No 1, a collection of papers by the Institute of the History of the Workers Movement of Croatia, Zagreb, 1984. 

Popular fronts
Kingdom of Yugoslavia
Political parties in Yugoslavia
Popular fronts of communist states
Socialism in the Kingdom of Yugoslavia
1945 establishments in Yugoslavia
1990 disestablishments in Yugoslavia
Organizations established in 1945
Organizations disestablished in 1990
Socialist Federal Republic of Yugoslavia
Communist organizations in Europe
League of Communists of Yugoslavia